Brian Thomas Macdonald is a Canadian politician, who was elected to the Legislative Assembly of New Brunswick in the 2010 provincial election. He represented the electoral district of Fredericton West-Hanwell (and previously for Fredericton-Silverwood) until 2018 as a member of the Progressive Conservatives.

Macdonald served as Government Whip and Legislative Secretary to the Premier with responsible for Intergovernmental Affairs and Military Affairs from 2010 to 2014.

In the 2014 provincial election he was elected in the new riding of Fredericton West-Hanwell defeating New Brunswick NDP leader Dominic Cardy.

On January 21, 2016, Macdonald announced his candidacy for the leadership of the Progressive Conservative Party of New Brunswick.

On June 22, 2016 Macdonald helped to unveil the LAV Memorial for Canadian soldiers killed in Afghanistan in Oromocto.

Personal

Before entering provincial politics, Macdonald served in the Canadian Armed Forces in Bosnia and worked in Iraq. He had served as a policy advisor to the previous Minister of National Defence Peter Mackay.

Education 
Macdonald studied politics and history at the Royal Military College of Canada. Macdonald did his graduate studies in England at the London School of Economics where he earned his master's degree in politics as a Mackenzie King Travelling Scholar.

References

External links
Brian Macdonald Campaign Official website

Progressive Conservative Party of New Brunswick MLAs
Living people
Politicians from Fredericton
University of King's College alumni
Royal Military College of Canada alumni
Alumni of the London School of Economics
21st-century Canadian politicians
Year of birth missing (living people)